Roman Osin, BSC, (born 1961, Leipzig, East Germany) is a British cinematographer of German-Nigerian descent. Osin studied at London College of Printing (now London College of Communication) from 1981–85, taking a BA in Film and Photography, and later National Film and Television School from 1991 to 95. After leaving the College of Printing, Roman Osin started as director of music videos, and also directed three dance movies commissioned by the Arts Council. Since September 2005, Roman Osin has been a member of the British Society of Cinematographers.

Filmography

External links
Roman Osin at the International Encyclopedia of Cinematographers

1961 births
Living people
British cinematographers
Alumni of the National Film and Television School